During the 2008–09 Dutch football season, AZ Alkmaar competed in the Eredivisie, playing their 42nd season of competitive football (Alkmaar '54 and FC Zaanstreek had merged to form AZ in May 1967).

Season summary
The club won its first Eredivisie title since 1981 and remains the second top flight title in its history to this day. The club secured 80 points in the 34 games under Louis van Gaal and finished 11 points ahead of second placed FC Twente. AZ were knocked out of the KNVB Cup in the quarterfinals suffering a 2-1 home loss to NAC Breda, although they did secure a notable 1-0 (aet) win over PSV Eindhoven in the third round.

van Gaal left the club at the end of the season to join FC Bayern Munich and was succeeded by Ronald Koeman.

First-team squad
Squad at end of season

Left club during season

References

Notes

AZ Alkmaar seasons
AZ Alkmaar
Dutch football championship-winning seasons